China–Pakistan Economic Corridor (CPEC) is a 3000 km Chinese infrastructure network project undertaken in Pakistan. This sea-and-land based corridor is aimed to secure and reduce the passage for China's energy imports from the Middle Eastern countries by avoiding existing route from the Straits of Malacca between Malaysia and Indonesia, which in case of a war could be blocked and thus hampering the Chinese energy dependent economical avenues. Developing a deep water port at Gwadar in Arabian Sea and a well built road and rail line from this port to Xinjiang Province in western China would be a shortcut for boosting the trade between Europe and China. In Pakistan, its aim is to overcome an electricity shortfall, infrastructural development and modernize transportation networks. Along with shifting it from an agricultural based economic structure to industrial based.

CPEC's potential impact on Pakistan has been compared to that of the Marshall Plan undertaken by the United States in post-war Europe. Pakistani officials predict that CPEC will result in the creation of upwards of 2.3 million jobs between 2015 and 2030, and add 2 to 2.5 percentage points to the country's annual economic growth. As of 2022, it has enhanced Pakistan’s exports and development capacity and is providing 1/4th of total electricity.

It is also seen as addressing a national security issue for China by economic development of the Xinjiang region thus reducing militant influence on Muslim separatists of native Uyghurs. After the proposal from Chinese President Li Keqiang in 2013, the preliminary study on this project was done in 2014 which acknowledged the hostile environment and complicated geographic conditions but prioritized the importance of having a China-run port near the Gulf of Oman which serves as an important route for oil tankers. Post this corridor is functional, existing 12,000 km journey of oil transportation to China will be reduced to just 2,395 km. This is estimated to save China $2 billion per year. China had already acquired control of Gwadar Port on 16 May 2013. Originally valued at $46 billion, the value of CPEC projects was worth $62 billion as of 2020. In 2022, the Chinese investment in Pakistan rose to $65 billion. China refers to this project as revival of the Silk Road. CPEC envisages to rapidly upgrade Pakistan's required infrastructure and thereby strengthening its economy to an extent by constructing modern transportation networks, numerous energy projects, and special economic zones.

The potential industries being set up in the CPEC special economic zones include food processing, cooking oil, ceramics, gems and jewelry, marble, minerals, agriculture machinery, iron and steel, motorbike assembling, electrical appliances and automobile

Even though China and Pakistan signed the official MoUs in 2015, the first details of long term plan under CPEC were publicly disclosed in 2017 when a Pakistani media outlet revealed its access to the Original Documents.

According to the World Bank researchers,"Chinese lenders require strict confidentiality from their debtors and do not release a granular breakdown of their lending." In 2015, the Governor of Central Bank in Pakistan, Ashraf Mahmood Wathra said, "I don't know out of $46 billion, how much is debt, how much is equity and how much is in kind" and did not know what the debt implications of CPEC actually were.

From early 1990s, IMF has provided more than a dozen bailouts on requests by Pakistan to save its dwindling economy, which has struggled 22 of the 30 years in meeting the austerity measures demanded by IMF. Nadeem-ul-Haque, a former IMF official and former deputy chairman of the Pakistani government’s Planning Commission wrote, "The pattern is always the same, with the Fund’s blessing, the government goes on a shopping spree, taking out costly loans for expensive projects, thus building up even more debt and adding new inefficiencies. After a few years, another crisis ensues, and it is met by another IMF program." The Pakistani establishment sees Chinese loans as an alternative to IMF loans.
Should the initial $46 billion worth of projects be implemented, the value of those projects would be roughly equivalent to all foreign direct investment in Pakistan since 1970, and would be equal to 17% of Pakistan's 2015 gross domestic product. CPEC is seen as the main plank of China's Belt and Road Initiative.

Chinese monetary offer for Pakistan under CPEC being a combination of Debt & Equity, it is evaluated that the Debt component will be serviced at 7%-8% interest per annum while Equity component is expected to deliver an estimated ROE of 17% per annum. The Pakistan government, however, claims that the Chinese loans will be repaid over a period of 20–25 years at rate of 2% interest. Pakistan has already started negotiating the debt-relief from China owing to difficulties to repay the loan and is seeking ease in the payment obligations towards debt and its interest for the projects under CPEC. As of 2022, Pakistan owes China about $30 billion which accounts for nearly 30% of its foreign debt.

Since 2021, due to the growing pressure on China for being the world's biggest polluter, it has shifted its focus from coal based energy investments in Pakistan to renewables. This is done to promote a more "greener" image of CPEC. In June 2022, the Karot Hydropower started commercial operations to provide cheap and clean electricity, and aims to reduce 3.5 million metric tons of carbon emissions annually.

History

Background

Plans for a corridor stretching from the Chinese border to Pakistan's deepwater ports on the Arabian Sea date back to the 1950s, and motivated construction of the Karakoram Highway beginning in 1959. Chinese interest in Pakistan's deep-water harbor at Gwadar had been rekindled by in 2002 China began construction at Gwadar port which was completed in 2006. Expansion of Gwadar Port then ceased thereafter owing to political instability in Pakistan following the fall of General Pervez Musharraf and subsequent conflict between the Pakistani state and Taliban militants.

In 2013, the then Pakistani President Asif Ali Zardari and Chinese Premier Li Keqiang decided to further enhance mutual connectivity. A memorandum of understanding on cooperation for long-term plan on China–Pakistan Economic Corridor between the two governments was inked by Xu Shao Shi and Shahid Amjad Chaudhry.

In February 2014, Pakistani President Mamnoon Hussain visited China to discuss the plans for an economic corridor in Pakistan. Two months later, Pakistan Prime Minister Nawaz Sharif met with Premier Li Kequiang in China to discuss further plans, resulting in the full scope of the project to be devised under Sharif's tenure. In November 2014, Chinese government announced its intention to finance Chinese companies as part of its $45.6 billion energy and infrastructure projects in Pakistan as part of CPEC.

Announcement of CPEC

Chinese President Xi Jinping on his “fate-changing visit” to Pakistan for signing the CPEC agreement stated “I feel as if I am going to visit the home of my own brother,” and claimed that friendship between the two nations was “higher than mountains, deeper than oceans and sweeter than honey”. China repeatedly uses terms like "iron brothers" and "all weather friends" while describing its relation with Pakistan. On 20 April 2015, Pakistan and China signed an agreement to commence work on the $46 billion agreement, which is roughly 20% of Pakistan's annual GDP, with approximately $28 billion worth of fast-tracked "Early Harvest" projects to be developed by the end of 2018.

A vast network of highways and railways are to be built under the aegis of CPEC that will span the length and breadth of Pakistan. Inefficiencies stemming from Pakistan's mostly dilapidated transportation network are estimated by the government to cause a loss of 3.55% of the country's annual GDP. Modern transportation networks built under CPEC will link seaports in Gwadar and Karachi with northern Pakistan, as well as points further north in western China and Central Asia. A 1,100-kilometre-long motorway will be built between the cities of Karachi and Lahore as part of CPEC, while the Karakoram Highway from Hasan Abdal to the Chinese border will be completely reconstructed and overhauled. The currently stalled Karachi–Peshawar main railway line will also be upgraded to allow for train travel at up to 160 km per hour by December 2019. Pakistan's railway network will also be extended to eventually connect to China's Southern Xinjiang Railway in Kashgar. The estimated $11 billion required to modernise transportation networks will be financed by subsidized concessionary loans.

Over $33 billion worth of energy infrastructure are to be constructed by private consortia to help alleviate Pakistan's chronic energy shortages, which regularly amount to over 4,500MW, and have shed an estimated 2–2.5% off Pakistan's annual gross domestic product. Over 10,400 MW of generating capacity is to be brought online by the end of 2018, with the majority developed as part of CPEC's fast-tracked "Early Harvest" projects. A network of pipelines to transport liquefied natural gas and oil will also be laid as part of the project, including a $2.5 billion pipeline between Gwadar and Nawabshah to eventually transport gas from Iran. Electricity from these projects will primarily be generated from fossil fuels, though hydroelectric and wind-power projects are also included, as is the construction of one of the world's largest solar farms.

Should the initial $46 billion worth of projects be implemented, the value of those projects would be roughly equivalent to all foreign direct investment in Pakistan since 1970, and would be equal to 17% of Pakistan's 2015 gross domestic product. CPEC is seen as the main plank of China's Belt and Road Initiative. At the beginning of this project, Pakistan has assigned about 10,000 troops to protect the Chinese investments. However, this number increased to 15,000 actively deployed troops by 2016.

Subsequent developments
On 12 August 2015 in the city of Karamay, China and Pakistan signed 20 more agreements worth $1.6 billion to further augment the scale and scope of CPEC. Details of the plan are opaque, but are said to mainly focus on increasing energy generation capacity. As part of the agreement, Pakistan and China have agreed to co-operate in the field of space research.

In September and October 2015, the government of the United Kingdom announced two separate grants to the Government of Pakistan for construction of roadways that are complementary to CPEC. In November 2015, China included the CPEC into its 13th five-year development plan, while in December 2015, China and Pakistan agreed on a further $1.5 billion investment to set up an information and technology park as part of the CPEC project. On 8 April 2016, during the visit of Xinjiang's Communist Party chief Zhang Chunxian companies from Xinjiang with their Pakistan counterparts signed $2 billion of additional agreements covering infrastructure, solar power and logistics.

The first convoy from China arrived in Gwadar on 13 November 2016, thereby formalizing operation of CPEC. On 2 December 2016, the first cargo train, launching the direct rail route and sea freight service between China and Pakistan, departed from Yunnan. A cargo train loaded with 500 tonnes of commodities left Kunming for the port city of Guangzhou from where the cargo will be loaded on ships and transported to Karachi, marking the opening of the new route. The new rail, sea freight will cut logistics cost, including that of transport, by 50 per cent.

In November 2016, China announced an additional $8.5 billion investment in Pakistan with $4.5 billion allocated to upgrade Pakistan's main railway line from Karachi to Peshawar including tracks, speed, and signaling, and $4 billion toward an LNG terminal and transmission lines to help alleviate energy shortages. In February 2017, the Egyptian Ambassador to Pakistan expressed interest in CPEC cooperation. In January 2017, Chief Minister Pervez Khattak of Khyber Pakhtunkhwa stated that he had received assurances from Chinese investment companies that they would invest up to $20 billion for projects. In March 2017, an agreement was signed for the projects, which include: a $1.5 billion oil refinery, irrigation projects worth $2 billion, a $2 billion motorway between Chitral and DI Khan, and $7 billion worth of hydro-electric projects.

As of September 2017, more than $14 billion worth of projects were under construction. In March 2018, Pakistan announced that following the completion of under-construction energy projects, future CPEC energy projects would be geared towards hydropower projects.

In 2022, Federal Minister for Planning, Development and Special Initiatives Prof. Ahsan Iqbal criticized CPEC authority for its inability to attract investments and called for its dissolution. On 17 August 2022, Prime Minister Shehbaz Sharif approved, in principle, to abolish the China–Pakistan Economic Corridor (CPEC) Authority subject to consent by China.

Projects in Gwadar Port and City

Gwadar came in the focus of attention post the Kargil War when Pakistan felt the need of having a military naval port and the Karachi-Gwadar Road (Coastal Highway) was built for defence purpose.
Gwadar forms the crux of the CPEC project, as it is envisaged to be the link between China's ambitious One Belt, One Road project, and its 21st Century Maritime Silk Road project. In total, more than $1 billion worth of projects are to be developed around the port of Gwadar by December 2017.

As of 2022, only three China–Pakistan Economic Corridor projects -  $4 million Gwadar Smart Port City Master Plan, $300 million Physical Infrastructure of Gwadar Port and the Free Zone Phase-1, and a $10 million  Pak-China Technical and Vocational Institute - in Gwadar were declared successfully completed whereas one-dozen projects worth nearly $2 billion remain undeveloped including water supply, electricity provision, expressway, international airport, fishing harbour and hospital among others.

China has provided a total of 7,000 sets of solar panels for households in Gwadar over the past two years. Another 10,000 sets of solar panels are under active preparation and will be allocated to poor people in Balochistan. The Chinese Embassy in Pakistan is also to donate household solar units and other assistance to the people of Balochistan.

Gwadar Port Complex

Initial infrastructure works at Gwadar Port commenced in 2002 and were completed in 2007, however plans to upgrade and expand Gwadar's port stalled. Under CPEC agreement, Gwadar Port will initially be expanded and upgraded to allow for docking of larger ships with deadweight tonnage of up to 70,000. Improvement plans also include construction of a $130 million breakwater around the port, as well as the construction of a floating liquefied natural gas facility that will have a capacity of 500 million cubic feet of liquefied natural gas per day and will be connected to the Gwadar-Nawabshah segment of the Iran–Pakistan gas pipeline.

The expanded port is located near a 2,282-acre free trade area in Gwadar which is being modeled on the lines of the Special Economic Zones of China. The swathe of land was handed to the China Overseas Port Holding Company in November 2015 as part of a 43-year lease. The site will include manufacturing zones, logistics hubs, warehouses, and display centres. Businesses located in the zone would be exempt from customs authorities as well as many provincial and federal taxes. Business established in the special economic zone will be exempt from Pakistani income, sales, and federal excise taxes for 23 years. Contractors and subcontractors associated with China Overseas Port Holding Company will be exempted from such taxes for 20 years, while a 40-year tax holiday will be granted for imports of equipment, materials, plant/machinery, appliances, and accessories that are to be for construction of Gwadar Port and special economic zone.

The special economic zone will be completed in three phases. By 2025, it is envisaged that manufacturing and processing industries will be developed, while further expansion of the zone is intended to be complete by 2030. On 10 April 2016, Zhang Baozhong, chairman of China Overseas Port Holding Company said in a conversation with The Washington Post that his company planned to spend $4.5  billion on roads, power, hotels and other infrastructure for the industrial zone as well as other projects in Gwadar city.

Projects in Gwadar city

China will grant Pakistan $230 million to construct a new international airport in Gwadar. The provincial government of Balochistan has set aside 4000 acres for the construction of the new $230 million Gwadar International Airport which will require an estimated 30 months for construction, the costs of which are to be fully funded by grants from the Chinese government which Pakistan will not be obliged to repay.

The city of Gwadar is further being developed by the construction of a 300 MW coal power plant, a desalinization plant, and a new 300-bed hospital to be completed in 2023. Plans for Gwadar city also include construction of the Gwadar East Bay Expressway – a 19 kilometre controlled-access road that will connect Gwadar Port to the Makran Coastal Highway. These additional projects are estimated to cost $800 million, and are to be financed by 0% interest loans extended by the Exim Bank of China to Pakistan.

In addition to the aforementioned infrastructure works, the Pakistani government announced in September 2015 its intention to establish a training institute named Pak-China Technical and Vocational Institute at Gwadar, which is to be developed by the Gwadar Port Authority at the cost of 943 million rupees, and is designed to impart to residents the skills required to operate and work at the expanded Gwadar Port.

As of 2017, in total there are 9 projects funded by China in and around Gwadar.

Development of Gwadar includes the building of a hospital under a Chinese government grant. Under the proposed project medical blocks, nursing and paramedical institutes, medical college, central laboratory, and other allied facilities are to be constructed with the supply of medical equipment and machinery.

In 2020, Government released funds of Rs 320 million for a seawater desalination plant at Gwadar, with a capacity of five million gallons a day. The funds were also to be used in the expansion of the optical fiber network in Gwadar. and construction of a fish landing jetty.

Roadway projects

The CPEC project envisages major upgrades and overhauls to Pakistan's transportation infrastructure. Under the CPEC project, China has announced financing for $10.63  billion worth of transportation infrastructure so far;  $6.1  billion have been allocated for constructing "Early Harvest" roadway projects at an interest rate of 1.6 percent. The remainder of funds will be allocated when the Pakistani government awards contracts for the construction of road segments which are still in the planning phase.

Three corridors have been identified for cargo transport: the Eastern Alignment through the heavily populated provinces of Sindh and Punjab where most industries are located, the Western Alignment through the less developed and more sparsely populated provinces of Khyber Pakhtunkhwa and Balochistan, and the future Central Alignment which will pass through Khyber Pakhtunkhwa, Punjab, and Balochistan.

Karakoram Highway

	
The CPEC projects call for reconstruction and upgrade works on National Highway 35 (N-35), which forms the Pakistani portion of the Karakoram Highway (KKH). The KKH spans the 887-kilometer long distance between the China-Pakistan border and the town of Burhan, near Hasan Abdal. At Burhan, the existing M1 motorway will intersect the N-35 at the Shah Maqsood Interchange. From there, access onwards to Islamabad and Lahore continues as part of the existing M1 and M2 motorways. Burhan will also be at the intersection of the Eastern Alignment, and Western Alignment.

Upgrades to the 487-kilometer long section between Burhan and Raikot of the Karakoram Highway are officially referred to in Pakistan as the Karakoram Highway Phase 2 project. At the southern end of the N-35, works are already underway to construct a 59-kilometer-long, 4-lane controlled-access highway between Burhan and Havelian which upon completion will be officially referred to as the E-35 expressway. North of Havelian, the next 66 kilometres of road will be upgraded to a 4-lane dual carriageway between Havelian and Shinkiari. Groundbreaking on this portion commenced in April 2016.

The entire 354 kilometres of roadway north of Shinkiari and ending in Raikot, near Chilas will be constructed as a 2-lane highway. Construction on the first section between Shinkiari and Thakot commenced in April 2016 jointly with construction of the Havelian to Shinkiari 4-lane dual carriageway further south. Construction on both these sections is expected to be completed with 42 months at a cost of approximately $1.26 billion with 90% of funding to come from China's EXIM bank in the form of low interest rate concessional loans.

Between Thakot and Raikot spans an area in which the government of Pakistan is currently either planning or actively constructing several hydropower projects, most notably the Diamer-Bhasha Dam and Dasu Dam. Sections of the N-35 around these projects will be completely rebuilt in tandem with dam construction. In the interim, this section of the N-35 is currently being upgraded from its current state until dam construction commences in full force at a later date. Improvement projects on this section are expected to be completed by January 2017 at a cost of approximately $72 million. The next 335 kilometres of roadway connect Raikot to the China-Pakistan border. Reconstruction works on this section of roadway preceded the CPEC, and were initiated after severe damage to roadways in the area following the 2010 Pakistan floods. Most of this section of roadway was completed in September 2012 at a cost of $510 million.

A large earthquake rocked the region nearest to the China-Pakistan border in 2010, triggering massive landslides that dammed the Indus River, resulting in the formation of the Attabad Lake. Portions of the Karakoram Highway were submerged in the lake, forcing all vehicular traffic onto barges to traverse the new reservoir. Construction on a 24 kilometer series of bridges and tunnels to Attabad Lake began in 2012 and required 36 months for completion. The bypass consists of 2 large bridges and 5 kilometres worth of tunnels that were inaugurated for public use on 14 September 2015 at a cost of $275 million. The 175 kilometre road between Gilgit and Skardu will be upgraded to a 4-lane road at a cost of $475 million to provide direct access to Skardu from the N-35.

Eastern Alignment

The term Eastern Alignment of CPEC refers to roadway projects located in Sindh and Punjab provinces – some of which were first envisioned in 1991. As part of the Eastern Alignment, a 1,152 km long motorway will connect Pakistan's two largest cities, Karachi and Lahore with 6-lane controlled access highway designed for travel speeds up to 120 kilometres per hour. The entire project will cost approximately $6.6 billion, with the bulk of financing to be distributed by various Chinese state-owned banks.

The entire Eastern Alignment motorway project is divided into four sections: a 136-kilometer long section between Karachi and Hyderabad also known as the  M9 motorway, a 345-kilometer long section between Hyderabad and Sukkur, a 392-kilometer long section between Sukkur, and Multan, and a 333-kilometer section between Multan and Lahore via the town of Abdul Hakeem.

The first section of the project is providing high-speed road access from the Port of Karachi to the city of Hyderabad and interior Sindh. Upgrade and construction works on this section currently known as Super Highway between Karachi and Hyderabad began in March 2015, and will convert the road into the 4-lane controlled access M9 Motorway which was completed in an estimated 30 months. In February 2017, a completed 75 kilometer stretch of the motorway was opened for public use by Prime Minister Nawaz Sharif.

At the terminus of the M9 motorway in Hyderabad, the Karachi-Lahore Motorway will continue onwards to Sukkur as a six-lane controlled-access motorway known also as M6 motorway that will be 345 kilometers long, The planned cost for this project is $1.7 billion, and will provide high-speed road access to interior Sindh – especially near the towns of Matiari, Nawabshah, and Khairpur. The project will require the construction of seven interchanges, and 25 bridges on the Indus river and irrigation canals. The planned route of the motorway runs roughly parallel to the existing National Highway and Indus Highway at various portions. In July 2016, the Pakistani government announced that the project would be open to international bidders on a build-operate-transfer basis, with Chinese and South Korean companies expressing interest in the project.

The 392 kilometers Sukkur to Multan section of the motorway is estimated to cost $2.89  billion, with construction works inaugurated on this section of roadway on 6 May 2016 and completed in September 2019.
. The road will be a six lane wide controlled access highway, with 11 planned interchanges, 10 rest facilities, 492 underpasses, and 54 bridges along its route. The Pakistani government in January 2016 awarded the contract to build this section to China State Construction Engineering, but final approvals required for disbursement of funds were not granted by the Government of the People's Republic of China until May 2016. 90% of the project's cost is to be financed by concessionary loans from China, with the remaining 10% to be financed by the government of Pakistan. Construction on this segment is expected to last 36 months.

Construction of the portion between Multan and Lahore costing approximately $1.5 billion was launched in November 2015 as a joint venture between the China Railway Construction Corporation Limited and Pakistan's Zahir Khan and Brothers Engineers The total length of this motorway section is 333 kilometres; however, the first 102 kilometres of the road between Khanewal and Abdul Hakeem is designed as part of the M4 Motorway, and is being funded by the Asian Development Bank. The portion of motorway between Abdul Hakeem and Lahore that is under construction as part of CPEC will consist of the remaining 231 kilometers.

Western Alignment

The CPEC project envisages an expanded and upgraded road network in the Pakistani provinces of Balochistan, Khyber Pakhtunkhwa, and western Punjab Province as part of the Western Alignment. The Western Alignment project will result in the upgrading of several hundred kilometers worth of road into 2 and 4-lane divided highways by mid-2018, with land acquisition sufficient for upgrading parts of the road to a 6-lane motorway in the future. In total, the CPEC project envisages reconstruction of 870 kilometers of road in Balochistan province alone as part of the Western Alignment. Of those 870 kilometers of road, 620 kilometers have already been rebuilt as of January 2016.

The Western Alignment roadway network will begin at the Barahma Bahtar Interchange on the M1 Motorway near the towns of Burhan and Hasan Abdal in northern Punjab province. The newly reconstructed Karakoram Highway will connect to the Western Alignment at Burhan, near where the new 285-kilometre-long controlled-access Brahma Bahtar-Yarik Motorway will commence. The motorway will terminate near the town of Yarik, just north of Dera Ismail Khan. Groundbreaking for the project took place on 17 May 2016. The motorway will traverse the Sindh Sagar Doab region, and cross the Indus River at Mianwali before entering into Khyber Pakhtunkhwa province. It will consist of 11 interchanges, 74 culverts, and 3 major bridges spanning the Indus, Soan, and Kurram Rivers. Total costs for the project are expected to be $1.05 billion.

At the southern terminus of the new Brahma Bahtar-Yarik motorway, the N50 National Highway will also be upgraded between Dera Ismail Khan in Khyber Pakhtunkhwa and Zhob in neighbouring Balochistan province, with eventual reconstruction between Zhob and Quetta. The upgraded roadway will consist of a 4 lane dual-carriageway spanning the 205 kilometre distance between the two cities. The first portion of the N50 to be upgraded will be the 81 kilometre portion of the N50 between Zhob and Mughal Kot, with construction works having begun in January 2016. Construction on this portion is expected to be completed by 2018 at a cost of $86 million. While the project is considered a vital link in the CPEC's Western Alignment, the project's cost will not be financed by Chinese state-owned banks, but instead by Asian Development Bank under a 2014 agreement which preceded CPEC, as well as by a grant provided by the United Kingdom's Department for International Development.
 
Heading south from Quetta, the Western Alignment of the CPEC will continue to the town of Surab in central Balochistan as the N25 National Highway. From Surab, a 470 kilometre long route known as the N85 National Highway will connect central Balochistan with the town of Hoshab in southwestern Balochistan province near the city of Turbat. The stretch of road between these cities was completed in December 2016, as per schedule.

Along the Western Alignment route, the towns of Hoshab and Gwadar are connected by a newly built 193-kilometer-long portion of the M8 Motorway – the Hoshab to Gwadar portion of the motorway was completed and inaugurated in February 2016 by Prime Minister Nawaz Sharif. 
The Western Alignment will be flanked by special economic zones along its route, with at least seven special economic zones planned to be established in Khyber Pakhtunkhwa.

Central Alignment
Long-term plans for a "Central Alignment" of the CPEC consist of a network of roads which is shortest route of CPEC and will commence in Gwadar and travel upcountry via the cities of Basima, Khuzdar, Sukkur, Rajanpur, Layyah, Muzaffargarh, and terminating in Dera Ismail Khan, with onward connections to Karakoram Highway via the Brahma Bahtar–Yarik Motorway.

Associated roadway projects

 ADB funded projects
The 184 kilometers long M-4 Motorway between Faisalabad and Multan does not fall under the scope of CPEC projects but is nevertheless considered vital to the CPEC transportation project. It will instead be financed by the Asian Development Bank and the Asian Infrastructure Investment Bank, and will be the first project jointly financed by those banks. Further funding comes from an additional $90.7  million grant announced in October 2015 by the government of the United Kingdom towards the construction of a portion of the M4 Motorway project.

The Karakoram Highway south of the city of Mansehra will also be upgraded into a controlled-access highway to officially be known as the E-35 expressway. While it is considered to be a crucial part of the route between Gwadar and China, the E35 will not be financed by CPEC funds. The project will instead be financed by the Asian Development Bank with a $121.6 million grant from the United Kingdom towards the project. Once completed, the E35 Expressway, the M4 Motorway, and Karachi-Lahore Motorway will provide continuous high-speed road travel on controlled-access motorways from Mansehra to Karachi – 1,550 kilometers away.

Approximately halfway between Zhob and Quetta, the town of Qilla Saifullah in Balochistan lies at the intersection of the N50 National Highway and the N70 National Highway. The two roads form the 447-kilometer route between Quetta and Multan in southern Punjab. While the N70 project is not officially a part of CPEC, it will connect the CPEC's Western Alignment to the Karachi-Lahore Motorway at Multan. Reconstruction works on the 126 kilometre portion of the N70 between Qilla Saifullah and Wagum are slated for completion by 2018, and are financed as part of a $195 million package by the Asian Development Bank, and by a $72.4 million grant from the United Kingdom's Department for International Development.

Railway projects

The CPEC project emphasises major upgrades to Pakistan's aging railway system, including rebuilding of the entire Main Line 1 railway between Karachi and Peshawar by 2020; this single railway currently handles 70% of Pakistan Railways traffic. As of 25.05.2022 this project is in doldrums due to reluctance of China to provide funds. In addition to the stalled Main Line 1 railway, upgrades and expansions are slated for the Main Line 2 railway, Main Line 3 railway. The CPEC plan also calls for completion of a rail link over the 4,693-meter high Khunjerab Pass. The railway will provide direct access for Chinese and East Asian goods to Pakistani seaports at Karachi and Gwadar by 2030.

Procurement of an initial 250 new passenger coaches, and reconstruction of 21 train stations are also planned as part of the first phase of the project – bringing the total investment in Pakistan's railway system to approximately $5  billion by the end of 2019. 180 of the coaches are to be built at the Pakistan Railways Carriage Factory near Islamabad, while the Government of Pakistan intends to procure an additional 800 coaches at a later date, with the intention of building 595 of those coaches in Pakistan.

In September 2018, the new government led by Prime Minister Imran Khan reduced the Chinese investment in railways by $2 billion to $6.2 billion because of financing burdens.

Main Line 1

The CPEC "Early Harvest" plan includes  a complete overhaul of the 1,687 kilometre long Main Line 1 railway (ML-1) between Karachi and Peshawar. The plan was initial floated in 2015, however as of January 2023 construction has not started on the project, with funding only secured in November 2022. The total costs of the project are estimated to be billion.

The upgrade plan involves doubling the track from Karachi to Peshawar, providing grade separation, as well as communications-based train control; this will allow increased capacity and faster trains on the line.

Main Line 2

In addition to upgrading the ML-1, the CPEC project also calls for similar major upgrade on the 1,254 kilometre long Main Line 2 (ML-2) railway between Kotri in Sindh province, and Attock in northern Punjab province via the cities of Larkana and Dera Ghazi Khan. The route towards northern Pakistan roughly parallels the Indus River, as opposed to the ML-1 which takes a more eastward course towards Lahore. The project also includes a plan to connect Gwadar, to the town of Jacobabad, Sindh which lies at the intersection of the ML-2 and ML-3 railways.

Main Line 3

Medium term plans for the Main Line 3 (ML-3) railway line will also include construction of a 560 kilometer long railway line between Bostan near Quetta, to Kotla Jam in Bhakkar District near the city of Dera Ismail Khan, which will provide access to southern Afghanistan. The railway route will pass through the city of Quetta and Zhob before terminating in Kotla Jam, and is expected to be constructed by 2025.

Khunjerab Railway

Longer term projects under CPEC also call for construction of the 682 kilometre long Khunjerab Railway line between the city of Havelian, to the Khunjerab Pass on the Chinese border, with extension to China's Lanxin Railway in Kashgar, Xinjiang. The railway will roughly parallel the Karakoram Highway, and is expected to be complete in 2030.

The cost of the entire project is estimated to be approximately $12 billion, and will require 5 years for completion. A 300 million rupee study to establish final feasibility of constructing the rail line between Havelian and the Chinese border is already underway. A preliminary feasibility study was completed in 2008 by the Austrian engineering firm TBAC.

Lahore Metro

The $1.6 billion Orange Line of the Lahore Metro is regarded as a commercial project under CPEC. Construction on the line has already begun, with initial planned completion by Winter 2017 however this has been delayed several times, first to end of 2018, later to 2019 and 2020. It finally launched on 25 October 2020. When complete, the project will have the capacity to transport 250,000 commuters per day, with plans to increase capacity to 500,000 commuters per day by 2025.

Energy sector projects

Pakistan's current energy generating capacity is 24,830 MW,. Energy generation will be a major focus of the CPEC project, with approximately $33 billion expected to be invested in this sector. An estimated 10,400 MW of electricity are slated for generation by March 2018 as part of CPEC's "Early Harvest" projects.

The energy projects under CPEC will be constructed by private Independent Power Producers, rather than by the governments of either China or Pakistan. The Exim Bank of China will finance these private investments at 5–6% interest rates, while the government of Pakistan will be contractually obliged to purchase electricity from those firms at pre-negotiated rates. In April 2020, hit by the COVID-19 pandemic, Pakistan asked China to ease repayment terms on $30bn worth of power projects.

Renewable-energy

In March 2018, Pakistan announced that hydropower projects would be prioritized following the completion of under-construction power plants. Pakistan aims to produce 25% of its electricity requirements by renewable energy resources by 2030. China's Zonergy company will complete construction on the world's largest solar power plant – the 6,500 acre Quaid-e-Azam Solar Park near the city of Bahawalpur with an estimated capacity of 1000 MW is expected to be completed in December 2016. The first phase of the project has been completed by Xinjiang SunOasis, and has a generating capacity of 100 MW. The remaining 900 MW capacity will be installed by Zonergy under CPEC.

The Jhimpir Wind Power Plant, built by the Turkish company Zorlu Enerji has already begun to sell 56.4 MW of electricity to the government of Pakistan, though under CPEC, another 250 MW of electricity are to be produced by the Chinese-Pakistan consortium United Energy Pakistan and others at a cost of $659 million. Another wind farm, the Dawood wind power project is under development by HydroChina at a cost of $115 million, and will generate 50 MW of electricity by August 2016.

SK Hydro Consortium is constructing the 870 MW Suki Kinari Hydropower Project in the Kaghan Valley of Pakistan's Khyber Pakhtunkhwa province at a cost of $1.8 billion, SK Hydro will construct the project with financing by China's EXIM bank.

The $1.6 billion 720 MW Karot Dam which is under construction is part of the CPEC plan, but is to be financed separately by China's Silk Road Fund.

Pakistan and China have also discussed the inclusion of the 4,500 MW $14 billion Diamer-Bhasha Dam as part of the CPEC project, though as of December 2015, no firm decision has been made – though Pakistani officials remain optimistic at its eventual inclusion. On 14 November 2017, Pakistan dropped its bid to have Diamer-Bhasha Dam financed under the CPEC framework.

The $2.4 billion, 1,100 MW Kohala Hydropower Project being constructed by China's Three Gorges Corporation predates the announcement of CPEC, though funding for the project will now come from CPEC fund. The project was approved by the government of Pakistani-administered Kashmir, the Chinese government and the Three Gorges corporation in 2020, the move was protested by India, which claims Kashmir as its territory. Renewable energy projects also include a 640 MW Mahl hydro power project.

Coal

Despite several renewable energy projects, the bulk of new energy generation capacity under CPEC will be coal-based plants, with $5.8 billion worth of coal power projects expected to be completed by early 2019 as part of the CPEC's "Early Harvest" projects.

On 26 May, it was unveiled that transmission line of 660 KV would be laid between matiari and Lahore. The electricity would be produced from coal-based power plants at Thar, Port Qasim and Hub. It would have the capacity to supply 2000MW with 10 percent overloaded capability for 2 hours.

Balochistan
In Balochistan province, a $970 million coal power plant at Hub, near Karachi, with a capacity of 660 MW to be built by a joint consortium of China's China Power Investment Corporation and the Pakistani firm Hub Power Company as part of a larger $2 billion project to produce 1,320 MW from coal.

A 300 MW coal power plant is also being developed in the city of Gwadar, and is being financed by a 0% interest loan. Development of Gwadar also include a 132 KV(AIS) Grid Station along with associated D/C Transmission line at Down Town, Gwadar along with other 132 KV Sub Stations at Deep Sea Port Gwadar.

Punjab
The $1.8 billion Sahiwal Coal Power Project, in full operation since 3 July 2017, is a project in central Punjab that has a capacity of 1,320 MW. It was built by a joint venture of two Chinese firms: the Huaneng Shandong company and Shandong Ruyi, who will jointly own and operate the plant. Pakistan will purchase electricity from the consortium at a tariff of 8.36 US cents/kWh.

The $589 million project to establish a coal mine and a relatively small 300 MW coal power plant to be built in the town of Pind Dadan Khan by China Machinery Engineering Corporation in Punjab's Salt Range. Pakistan's NEPRA has been criticized for considering a relatively high tariff of 11.57 US cents/kWH proposed by the Chinese firm, which had been initially agreed at 8.25 US cents/kWH in 2014. The Chinese firm argued that coal transportation costs had greatly increased due to the nonavailability of coal from nearby mines which had initially been regarded as the primary coal source for the project. The company argued that coal would instead have to be transported from distant Sindh province, which along with inefficiencies in mining procedures, increased the cost of fuel by 30.5%.

Sindh
The Shanghai Electric company of China will construct two 660 MW power plants as part of the "Thar-I" project in the Thar coalfield of Sindh province, while "Thar-ll" will be developed by a separate consortium. The facility will be powered by locally sourced coal, and is expected to be put into commercial use in 2018. Pakistan's National Electric Power Regulatory Authority (NEPRA) has agreed to purchase electricity from both Thar-l and Thar-ll at a tariff of 8.50 US cents/kWh for the first 330 MW of electricity, 8.33 US cents/kWh for the next 660 MW, and 7.99 US cents/kWh for the next 1,099 MW as further phases are developed.

Near the Thar-I Project, the China Machinery Engineering Corporation in conjunction with Pakistan's Engro Corporation will construct two 330 MW power plants as part of the "Thar-ll Project" (having initially proposed the simultaneous construction of two 660 MW power plants) as well as developing a coal mine capable of producing up to 3.8 million tons of coal per year as part of the first phase of the project." The first phase is expected to be complete by early 2019, at a cost of $1.95 billion. Subsequent phases will eventually generate an additional 3,960 MW of electricity over the course of ten years. As part of infrastructure required for electricity distribution from the Thar l and ll Projects, the $2.1 billion Matiari to Lahore Transmission Line, and $1.5 billion in Matiari to Faisalabad transmission line are also to be built as part of the CPEC project.

The 1,320 MW $2.08 billion Pakistan Port Qasim Power Project near Port Qasim will be a joint venture of Al-Mirqab Capital from Qatar, and China's Power Construction Corporation – a subsidiary of Sinohydro Resources Limited. Pakistan's NEPRA and SinoHydro agreed to set the levelized tariff for electricity purchased from the consortium at 8.12 US cents/kWh. The first 660 MW reactor was commissioned in November 2017.

Liquified natural gas
Liquefied natural gas power LNG projects are also considered vital to CPEC. The Chinese government has announced its intention to build a $2.5 billion 711 kilometre gas pipeline from Gwadar to Nawabshah in province as part of CPEC. The pipeline is designed to be a part of the 2,775 kilometre long Iran–Pakistan gas pipeline, with the 80 kilometre portion between Gwadar and the Iranian border to be connected when sanctions against Tehran are eased; Iran has already completed a 900 kilometre long portion of the pipeline on its side of the border.

The Pakistani portion of the pipeline is to be constructed by the state-owned China Petroleum Pipeline Bureau. It will be  in diameter, and have the capacity to transport  of liquified natural gas every day, with an additional  of additional capacity when the planned off-shore LNG terminal is also completed The project will not only provide gas exporters with access to the Pakistani market, but will also allow China to secure a route for its own imports.

The project should not be confused with the $2 billion 1,100 kilometre North-South Pipeline liquified natural gas pipeline which is to be constructed with Russian assistance between Karachi and Lahore with anticipated completion by 2018. Nor should it be confused with the planned $7.5 billion TAPI Pipeline which is a planned project involving Turkmenistan, Afghanistan, Pakistan, and India.

Other LNG projects are currently under construction with Chinese assistance and financing that will augment the scope of CPEC, but are neither funded by nor officially considered a part of CPEC. The 1,223 MW Balloki Power Plant is currently under construction near Kasur, and is being constructed by China's Harbin Electric Company with financing from the China's EXIM bank, is one such example. In October 2015, Prime Minister Nawaz Sharif also inaugurated construction of the 1,180 MW Bhikhi Power Plant near Sheikhupura, which is to be jointly constructed by China's Harbin Electric Company and General Electric from the United States. It is expected to be Pakistan's most efficient power plant, and will provide enough power for an estimated 6 million homes. The facility became operational in May 2018.

"Early Harvest" projects

As part of the "Early Harvest" scheme of the CPEC, over 10,000 megawatts of electricity-generating capacity is to be developed between 2018 and 2020. While some "Early Harvest" projects will not be completed until 2020, the government of Pakistan plans to add approximately 10,000 MW of energy-generating capacity to Pakistan's electric grid by 2018 through the completion of projects which complement CPEC.

Although not officially under the scope of CPEC, the 1,223 MW Balloki Power Plant, and the 1,180 MW Bhakki powerplants have both been completed in mid-2018, which along with the 969 MW Neelum–Jhelum Hydropower Plant completed in summer 2018 and 1,410 MW Tarbela IV Extension Project, competed in February 2018, will result in an additional 10,000 MW being added to Pakistan's electricity grid by the end of 2018 with a combination of CPEC and non-CPEC projects. A further 1,000 MW of electricity will be imported to Pakistan from Tajikistan and Kyrgyzstan as part of the CASA-1000 project, which is expected to be launched in 2018.

Table of projects

Other areas of cooperation

The CPEC announcement encompassed not only infrastructure works, but also addressed areas of co-operation between China and Pakistan.

Agriculture and aquaculture 
CPEC includes provisions for cooperation in management of water resources, livestock, and other fields of agriculture. Under the plan, agricultural information project, storage and distribution of agricultural equipment and construction project, agricultural mechanisation, demonstration and machinery leasing project and fertiliser production project for producing 800,000 tons of fertiliser and 100,000 tons of bio-organic fertiliser will be implemented. The framework includes cooperation in Remote Sensing (RS) and Geographical Information System (GIS), food processing, pre-and-post-harvest handling and storage of agricultural produce, selection and breeding of new breeds of animals and new varieties of plants, specifically fisheries and aquaculture.

Science and technology

As part of CPEC, the two countries signed an Economic and Technical Cooperation Agreement, as well as pledged to "China-Pakistan Joint Cotton Bio-Tech Laboratory" The two countries also pledged to establish the "China-Pakistan Joint Marine Research Center" with State Oceanic Administration and Pakistan's Ministry of Science and Technology Also as part of the CPEC agreement, Pakistan and China have agreed to co-operate in the field of space research.

In February 2016, the two countries agreed to establish the "Pak-China Science, Technology, Commerce and Logistic Park" near Islamabad at an estimated cost of $1.5 billion. The park will be situated on 500 hectares, which will be provided by Pakistan to China's Xinjiang Production and Construction Corps, with all investments expected to come from the Chinese side over the course of ten years.

In May 2016, construction began on the $44 million 820 kilometer long Pakistan-China Fiber Optic Project, a Cross Border Optical Fiber Cable that will enhance telecommunication and ICT Industry in the Gilgit Baltistan, Khyber Pakhtunkhwa and Punjab region, while offering Pakistan a fifth route by which to transmit telecommunication traffic. which will be extended to Gwadar.

in May 2019, Vice President of China and Pakistan has decided to launch Huawei Technical Support Center in Pakistan.

CPEC include establishment of pilot project of Digital Terrestrial Multimedia Broadcast for Pakistan Television Corporation through Chinese grant at Rebroadcast Station (RBS) at Murree. ZTE Corporation will provide Pakistan Television Corporation collaboration across R&D of digital terrestrial television technologies, staff training and content creation including partnerships with Chinese multinational companies in multiple areas including television sets and set top boxes as international Cooperation.

Other fields

The two nations also pledged co-operation in field ranging from anti-narcotic efforts, to co-operation in an effort to reduce climate change. The two nations also agreed to increase co-operating between the banking sectors of the two countries, as well as to establish closer ties between China Central Television and the Pakistan Television Corporation.

Confucius Institute at University of Punjab is planned to be soon launched in 2019. Moreover, Rashakai Special Economic Zone on M1 Highway a motorway junction near Nowshehra is planned as well.

Finance

Concessionary loans

Approximately $11 billion worth of infrastructure projects being developed by the Pakistani government will be financed at an interest rate of 1.6%, after Pakistan successfully lobbied the Chinese government to reduce interest rates from an initial 3%. Loans will be dispersed by the Exim Bank of China, China Development Bank, and the ICBC. For comparison, loans for previous Pakistani infrastructure projects financed by the World Bank carried an interest rate between 5% and 8.5%, while interest rates on market loans approach 12%.

The loan money would be used to finance projects which are planned and executed by the Pakistani government.  Portions of the approximately $6.6 billion Karachi–Lahore Motorway are already under construction. The $2.9 billion phase which will connect the city of Multan to the city of Sukkur over a distance of 392 kilometres has also been approved, with 90% of costs to be financed by the Chinese government at concessionary interest rates, while the remaining 10% is to be financed by the Public Sector Development Programme of the Pakistani government. In May 2016, the $2.9 billion loan were given final approvals required prior to disbursement of the funds were given by the Government of the People's Republic of China on 4 May 2016, and will be concessionary loans with an interest rate of 2.0%. The National Highway Authority of Pakistan reported that contractors arrived on site soon after the loan received final approval.

The China Development Bank will finance the $920 million towards the cost of reconstruction of the 487 kilometer portion of the Karakoram Highway between Burhan and Raikot. An addition $1.26 billion will be lent by the China Exim Bank for the construction of the Havelian to Thakot portion of this 487 kilometer stretch of roadway, to be dispersed as low-interest rate concessionary loans.

$7 billion of the planned $8.2 billion overhaul of the Main Line 1 railway is to be financed by concessionary loans, which extended by China's state owned banks.

The long-planned 27.1 km long $1.6 billion Orange Line of the Lahore Metro is regarded as a commercial project, and does not qualify for the Exim Bank's 1.6% interest rate. It will instead by financed at a 2.4% interest rate after China agreed to reduce interest rates from an originally planned rate of 3.4%.

The $44 million Pakistan-China Fiber Optic Project, an 820 km long fibre optic wire connecting Pakistan and China, will be constructed using concessionary loans at an interest rate of 2%, rather than the 1.6% rate applied to other projects.

Interest-free loans

The government of China in August 2015 announced that concessionary loans for several projects in Gwadar totaling $757 million would be converted 0% interest loans. The projects which are now to financed by the 0% interest loans include: the construction of the $140 million East Bay Expressway project, installation of breakwaters in Gwadar which will cost $130 million, a $360 million coal power plant in Gwadar, a $27 million project to dredge berths in Gwadar harbor, and a $100 million 300-bed hospital in Gwadar. Thus, Pakistan only has to repay the principal on these loans.

In September 2015, the government of China also announced that the $230 million Gwadar International Airport project would no longer be financed by loans, but would instead be constructed by grants which the government of Pakistan will not be required to repay.

Private consortia

$15.5 billion worth of energy projects are to be constructed by joint Chinese-Pakistani firms, rather than by the governments of either China or Pakistan. The Exim Bank of China will finance those investments at 5–6% interest rates, while the government of Pakistan will be contractually obliged to purchase electricity from those firms at pre-negotiated rates.

As an example, the 1,223 MW Balloki Power Plant does not fall under the concessionary loan rate of 1.6%, as the project is not being developed by the Pakistani government. Instead, it is considered to be a private sector investment as its construction will be undertaken by a consortium of Harbin Electric and Habib Rafiq Limited after they successfully bid against international competitors. Chinese state-owned banks will provide loans to the consortium that are subsidised by the Chinese government. In the case of the Balloki Power Plant, state-owned banks will finance the project at an interest rate of 5%, while the Pakistani government will purchase electricity at the lowest bid rate of 7.973 cents per unit.

ADB assistance

While the Hazara Motorway is considered to be a crucial part of the route between Gwadar and China. M-15 will not be financed by CPEC funds. The project will instead be financed by the Asian Development Bank.

The N70 project is not officially a part of CPEC but will connect the CPEC's Western Alignment to the Karachi-Lahore Motorway at Multan. The project will be financed as part of a $195 million package by the Asian Development Bank announced in May 2015 to upgrade the N70 National Highway and N50 National Highway. In January 2016, The United Kingdom's Department for International Development announced a $72.4 million grant to Pakistan for roadway improvements in the province of Balochistan, thereby reducing the total Asian Development Bank loan from $195 million to $122.6 million.

The M-4 Motorway between Faisalabad and Multan is not to be financed by the Chinese government as part of CPEC, but will instead be the first infrastructure project partially financed by the Asian Infrastructure Investment Bank, and will be co-financed along with the Asian Development Bank for a total of approximately $275 million. Portions of the project will also be funded by a $90.7 million grant announced in October 2015 by the government of the United Kingdom towards the construction of the Gojra-Shorkot section of the M4 Motorway project.

Impact

The importance of CPEC to China is reflected by its inclusion as part of China's 13th five-year development plan. CPEC projects will provide China with an alternate route for energy supplies, as well as a new route by which Western China can conduct trade. Pakistan stands to gain due to upgrade of infrastructure and introduction of a reliable energy supply.

On 8 January 2017, Forbes claimed that CPEC is part of China's vision to write the rules of the next era of globalization and help its export and investment engines run for years to come. Writing in January 2017, Arun Mohan Sukumar of India's Observer Research Foundation claimed that "CPEC is an important enough project whose economic and strategic consequences require methodical assessment", adding that "CPEC may be a bilateral endeavour, but New Delhi cannot ignore its spillover effects on regional governance" and concluding that "India would be ill-advised to rely on the false comfort that profits alone will drive China's business with Pakistan".

According to China's prime minister, Li Keqiang, Pakistan's development through the project might "wean the populace from fundamentalism".

Environment
Pakistan is already distressed by climate change and global warming issues as about 5,000 its glaciers are melting at an alarming rate. It is affected by extreme weather patterns and seasonal shifts occurring in recent past.
The CPEC coal based power plants are not in line with Pakistan's own green policy. It is estimated that by the year 2030, around 371 metric tonne of Carbon dioxide will be the Greenhouse gas emission from CPEC projects. 56% of this will be contributed by energy sector. CPEC expects a daily commute of 7000 trucks which can potentially emit 36.5 million tons of CO2.

Since 2021, due to growing pressure on China for being the world's biggest polluter, it has since shifted its focus from coal based energy investments in Pakistan to renewables. This is being done in a bid to promote a more "greener"  image of CPEC.

Pakistani economy
The CPEC is a landmark project in the annals of history of Pakistan. It is the largest investment Pakistan has attracted since independence and largest by China in any foreign country. CPEC is considered economically vital to Pakistan in helping it drive economic growth. The Pakistani media and government have called CPEC investments a "game and fate changer" for the region, while both China and Pakistan intend that the massive investment plan will transform Pakistan into a regional economic hub and further boost the deepening ties between the two countries. Approximately 1 year after the announcement of CPEC, Zhang Baozhong, chairman of China Overseas Port Holding Company told The Washington Post that his company planned to spend an additional $4.5 billion on roads, power, hotels and other infrastructure for Gwadar's industrial zone, which would be one of the largest ever sums of foreign direct investment into Pakistan.

Pakistan as late as early 2017 faced energy shortfalls of over 4,500 MW on a regular basis with routine power cuts of up to 12 hours per day, which has shed an estimated 2–2.5% off its annual GDP. The Financial Times noted that Pakistan's electricity shortages are a major hindrance to foreign investment, and that Chinese investments in Pakistani infrastructure and power projects will lead to a "virtuous cycle" that will make the country more attractive for foreign investment in a variety of sectors. Poor availability of electricity is considered by the World Bank to be a main constraint to both economic growth and investment in Pakistan.

The impact of Chinese investments in Energy sector was soon visible as in December 2017, Pakistan succeeded in producing surplus electricity. Pakistani Federal Minister for Power Division, Awais Leghari announced a complete end to power cuts in 5,297 feeders out of total 8,600 and claimed that the country's current electricity production had gone up to 16,477 Megawatts which was 2700 megawatts more than the demand.

Pakistan's large textile industry has also been negatively affected by several-hour long power cuts, with almost 20% of textile factories in the city of Faisalabad shutting down on account of power shortages. The CPEC's "Early Harvest" projects are expected to resolve shortages in power generation by 2018 by increasing Pakistan's power generation capacity by over 10,000 megawatts. As a result of improved infrastructure and energy supplies, the Pakistani government expects that economic growth rates will reach 7% by 2018.

Former Pakistan Prime Minister Shaukat Aziz also stated in May 2016 that predicted economic growth from CPEC projects would result in stabilization of Pakistan's security situation, which has also been cited by the World Bank as hindrance to sustained economic growth in Pakistan.

According to Chinese Foreign Ministry Spokesperson Hua Chunying, the corridor will "serve as a driver for connectivity between South Asia and East Asia." Mushahid Hussain, chairman of the Pakistan-China Institute, told China Daily that the economic corridor "will play a crucial role in regional integration of the 'Greater South Asia', which includes China, Iran, Afghanistan, and stretches all the way to Myanmar." When fully built, the corridor is expected to generate significant revenue from transit fees levied on Chinese goods – to the tune of several billion dollars per annum. 
According to The Guardian, "The Chinese are not just offering to build much-needed infrastructure but also make Pakistan a key partner in its grand economic and strategic ambitions."

Moody's Investors Service has described the project as a "credit positive" for Pakistan. In 2015, the agency acknowledged that much of the project's key benefits would not materialize until 2017, but stated that it believes at least some of the benefits from the economic corridor would likely begin accruing even before then. The Asian Development Bank stated "CPEC will connect economic agents along a defined geography. It will provide connection between economic nodes or hubs, centered on urban landscapes, in which large amount of economic resources and actors are concentrated. They link the supply and demand sides of markets." On 14 November 2016, Hyatt Hotels Corporation announced plan's to open four properties in Pakistan, in partnership with Bahria Town Group, citing the investment of CPEC as the reason behind the $600 million investment.

On 12 March 2017, a consortium of Pakistani broker houses reported that Pakistan will end up paying $90 billion to China over a span of 30 years with annual average repayments of $3–4 billion per year post fiscal year 2020. The report further said that CPEC-related transportation would earn $400–500 million per annum to Pakistan, and would grow Pakistani exports by 4.5% a year till fiscal year 2025.

CPEC and the "Malacca Dilemma"

 
The Straits of Malacca provide China with its shortest maritime access to Europe, Africa, and the Middle East. Approximately 80% of its Middle Eastern energy imports also pass through the Straits of Malacca. As the world's biggest oil importer, energy security is a key concern for China while current sea routes used to import Middle Eastern oil are frequently patrolled by the United States' Navy.

In the event that China were to face hostile actions from a United States, energy imports through the Straits of Malacca could be impeded, which in turn may jeopardise the Chinese economy in a scenario that is frequently referred to as the "Malacca Dilemma". In addition to vulnerabilities faced in the Straits of Malacca region, China is heavily dependent upon sea-routes that pass through the South China Sea, near the disputed Spratly Islands and Paracel Islands, which are currently a source of tension between China, Taiwan, Vietnam, the Philippines, and the United States. The CPEC project will allow Chinese energy imports to circumvent these contentious areas and find a new artery in the west, and thereby decrease the possibility of confrontation between the United States and China. However, there is evidence to suggest that any pipelines from Gwadar up to China would be very expensive, would encounter numerous logistical difficulties including difficult terrain and potential terrorism, and would barely make any impact on China's overall energy security.

Access to western China

The CPEC Alignments will improve connectivity to restive Xinjiang, thereby increasing the region's potential to attract public and private investment. CPEC is considered central to China–Pakistan relations; its central importance is reflected by China's inclusion of the project as part of its 13th five-year development plan. The CPEC projects will also complement China's Western Development plan, which includes not only Xinjiang, but also the neighbouring regions of Tibet and Qinghai.

In addition to its significance to reduce Chinese dependence on the Sea of Malacca and South China Sea routes, CPEC will provide China an alternative and shorter route for energy imports from the Middle East, thereby reducing shipping costs and transit times. The currently available sea-route to China is roughly 12,000 kilometre long, while the distance from Gwadar Port to Xinjiang province is approximately 3,000 kilometre, with another 3,500 kilometre from Xinjiang to China's eastern coast. As a result of CPEC, Chinese imports and exports to the Middle East, Africa, and Europe would require much shorter shipment times and distances.

Route to circumvent Afghanistan
 
Negotiations to provide an alternate route to the Central Asian republics by way of China predate the announcement of CPEC. The Afghanistan–Pakistan Transit Trade Agreement of 2010 provided Pakistan access to Central Asia via Afghanistan; however, the full agreement has yet to be fully implemented. The "Quadrilateral Agreement on Traffic in Transit" (QATT) was first devised in 1995, and signed in 2004 by the governments of China, Pakistan, Kazakhstan, and Kyrgyzstan to facilitate transit trade between the various countries, with no inclusion of Afghanistan. Despite signing of the QATT, the agreement's full potential was never realized, largely on account of poor infrastructure links between the four countries prior to the announcement of CPEC.

During the visit of Afghan President Ashraf Ghani to India in April 2015, he stated "We will not provide equal transit access to Central Asia for Pakistani trucks" unless the Pakistani government included India as part of the 2010 Afghanistan–Pakistan Transit Trade Agreement. The current Transit Trade Agreement provides Afghanistan access to the Port of Karachi to conduct export trade with India, and allows Afghan goods to be transited up to any border of Pakistan, but does not guarantee Afghan trucks the right to traverse the Wagah Border, nor does the agreement permit Indian goods to be exported to Afghanistan via Pakistan. Owing to continued tensions between India and Pakistan, the Pakistani government expressed reluctance to include India in any trade negotiations with Afghanistan, and as a result, little progress was made between the Afghan and Pakistani sides.

In February 2016, the Pakistani government signalled its intention to completely bypass Afghanistan in its quest to access Central Asia by announcing its intent to revive the QATT so that Central Asian states could access Pakistani ports via Kashgar instead of Afghanistan, thereby allowing the Central Asian republics to access Pakistan's deep water ports without having to rely on a politically unstable Afghanistan as a transit corridor. In early March 2016, the Afghan government reportedly acquiesced to Pakistani requests to use Afghanistan as a corridor to Tajikistan, after having dropped demands from reciprocal access to India via Pakistan.

Alternate route to Central Asia

The heads of various Central Asian republics have expressed their desire to connect their infrastructure networks to the CPEC project via China. During the August 2015 visit of Pakistani Prime Minister Nawaz Sharif to Kazakhstan, the Kazakh Prime Minister Karim Massimov, conveyed Kazakhstan's desire to link its road network to the CPEC project. During the November 2015 visit of Tajikistan President Emomali Rahmon to Pakistan, the Tajik premier also expressed his government's desire to join the Quadrilateral Agreement on Traffic in Transit to use CPEC as a conduit for imports and exports to Tajikistan by circumventing Afghanistan; the request received political backing by the Pakistani Prime Minister.

The Chinese government has already upgraded the road linking Kashgar to Osh in Kyrgyzstan via the Kyrgyz town of Erkeshtam while a railway between Urumqi, China and Almaty, Kazakhstan has also been completed as part of China's One Belt One Road initiative. Numerous land crossings already exist between Kazakhstan and China as well. Additionally, the Chinese government has announced plans to lay railway track from Tashkent, Uzbekistan, towards Kyrgyzstan with onwards connections to China and Pakistan. Further, the Pamir Highway already provides Tajikistan access to Kashgar via the Kulma Pass. These crossings complement the CPEC project to provide Central Asian states access to Pakistan's deepwater ports by completely bypassing Afghanistan – a country which has been ravaged by civil war and political instability since the late 1970s.

Comparison to Chabahar Port

In May 2016, Indian Prime Minister Narendra Modi and his counterpart, Iranian President Hassan Rouhani, signed a series of twelve agreements in Tehran, in which India offered to refurbish one of Chabahar's ten existing berths, and reconstruct another berth at the Port of Chabahar, in order to allow Indian goods to be exported to Iran, with the possibility of onward connections to Afghanistan and Central Asia. As of February 2017, the project remains delayed while the governments of Iran and India blame one another for delays.

A section of the Indian media described it as "a counter to the China-Pakistan Economic Corridor", although the total monetary value of projects has been noted to be significantly less than that of CPEC.

As part of the twelve memorandums of understanding signed by Indian and Iranian delegations as per text released by India's Ministry of External Affairs, India will offer a $150 million line of credit extended by the Exim Bank of India, while India Ports Global also signed a contract with Iran's Aria Banader to develop berths at the port, at a cost of $85 million over the course of 18 months.

Under the agreement, India Ports Global will refurbish a 640 meter long container handling facility, and reconstruct a 600 meter long berth at the port. India further agreed to extend a $400 million line of credit to be used for the import of steel for the construction of a rail link between Chabahar and Zahedan, while India's IRCON and Iran's Construction, Development of Transport and Infrastructure Company signed a memorandum of understanding regarding the construction and finance of the Chabahar to Zahedan rail line at a cost of $1.6 billion.

India's Highways and Shipping Minister, Nitin Gadkari suggested that the free trade zone in Chabahar had the potential to attract upwards of $15 billion worth of investment in the future, although he stated that such investments are predicated upon Iran offering India natural gas at a rate of $1.50 per million British Thermal Units, which is substantially lower than the rate of $2.95 per million British Thermal Units offered by Iran. The two countries also signed a memorandum of understanding to explore the possibility of setting up an aluminum smelter at a cost of $2 billion, as well as establishing a urea processing facility in Chahbahar, although these investments are also contingent upon Iran supplying low-cost natural gas for operation of those facilities.

India, Iran, and Afghanistan also signed an agreement with the intention of simplifying transit procedures between the three countries. Despite the expressed desire to circumvent Pakistan in order to augment Iranian and Indian economic ties, Indian goods destined for Iran currently do not require transit through Pakistan, as those goods can be exported to Iran via Bandar Abbas, where India also currently maintains a diplomatic mission. Bandar Abbas is also consider a key node on the North–South Transport Corridor, backed by India and Russia since 2002. Indian goods also can be imported and transited across Iran upon arrival at Bandar-e Emam Khomeyni near the Iraqi border.

As per the Afghanistan–Pakistan Transit Trade Agreement, Afghan goods can be transited across Pakistan for export to India as well, though Indian goods cannot be exported to Afghanistan via Pakistan. Upon completion of Chabahar, Indian exporters will benefit from the potential ability to export goods to Afghanistan, a country with an annual gross domestic product estimated at $60.6 billion.

After signing the agreement, Iran's ambassador to Pakistan, Mehdi Honerdoost, stated that the agreement was "not finished", and that Iran would welcome the inclusion of both Pakistan and China in the project. While clarifying that Chabahar Port would not be a rival or enemy to Pakistan's Gwadar Port, he further stated that Pakistan and China had both been invited to contribute to the project before India, but according to Pakistani media neither China nor Pakistan had expressed interest in joining.

However, eventually, Iranian ambassador made it clear that Iran doesn't consider Chahbahar to be a project which could feasibly rival CPEC as he said "Iran is eager to join CPEC with its full capabilities, possibilities and abilities".

In July 2020, Pakistani media The News International reported that the Iranian government has dropped India from a long stalled rail project and has instead signed a comprehensive deal with China. 
This report was later refuted by the government of Iran, who stated that the investments from India didn't have anything to do with the railway project in the first place.

Security Issues
While agreements have specifically cited improvements for Afghan connectivity to the world as a benefit of Indian investment in the region, Afghanistan's politically instability could limit the potential usefulness of transit corridors to population centers near Kabul or Kandahar, as those routes traverse southern and eastern Afghanistan, where the Taliban is most active. The Chabahar plan relies upon connections to the Afghan Ring Road. By August 2016, the Taliban was noted to have captured large swathes of land in Helmand Province, and threatened to capture the provincial capital of Lashkar Gah, which lies on the portion of the Afghan Ring Road connecting Chabahar to Kandahar and Kabul. As a result, portions of the Afghan Ring Road were closed due to Taliban insurgent activity. Also in August 2016, the Taliban claimed responsibility for an attack which left twelve foreign tourists dead as they were traveling on an alternative route to the Afghan Ring Road, between Kabul and Herat. In September 2016, Iran's president Hassan Rouhani expressed his country's interest in joining CPEC during a meeting with Nawaz Sharif.
The Pakistan Army has taken the security responsibility of CPEC employees and investors which become more effective and healthy relationship between China and Pakistan.

Security

Security Forces
Pakistan Navy and Chinese Navy ships are to jointly guard the safety and security of the trade corridor, as Pakistan seeks to expand the role of its maritime forces. From December 2016, Pakistan's Navy established a special taskforce "TF-88" to ensure there is maritime security for trade. Chairman Parliamentary Committee on CPEC confirmed that Sindh province will dispatch 2000 police officers, while Punjab will dispatch 5000 police officers for the project, while the Pakistani Army will deploy 12,000 troops to safeguard the route. China plans to transfer 4 ships to the Pakistan Maritime Security Agency with two ships called PMSS Hingol and PMSS Basol. For territorial security, Pakistan has formed the Special Security Division. Pakistan plans to train 12,000 security personnel to protect Chinese workers on the corridor. As of August 2015, 8,000 Pakistani security officials were deployed for the protection of over 8,100 Chinese workers in Pakistan. Maqbool Ahmed, an investigative journalist from the now closed Herald reported large scale land acquisition involving tens of thousands of acres near a lagoon in Gwadar by the Pakistani Navy for building a massive garrison in order to secure maritime security.

As part of CPEC, Pakistan has boosted its international engagement in terms of foreign policy with China, Iran, USA, Turkey and Malaysia are to be engaged for the maritime economy related to CPEC. Iranian President Rouhani revealed his intentions to Pakistan to join CPEC in a meeting at the UN Russia has also expressed support for CPEC.

The Special Security Division, headed by a Major General, would consist of nine army battalions and six wings of civil armed forces. Similarly, Gwadar Security Task Force is another formation to be raised, commanded by a Brigadier. These security measures for Chinese projects would cost an estimated total of Rupees 10 Billion as of 2015. The Chief of Army Staff visited CPEC Security headquarters in February 2016 and vowed that “the security forces are ready to pay any price” for successful completion of CPEC projects. The NEPRA in Pakistan has raised concerns on the alarming rate of growth in security expenditure of Power Projects under CPEC, which it considers to be "dark".

Baloch militants
The Balochistan National Party (Mengal) (BNP-M), the Baloch National Front (BNF), the Baloch Republican Party, and militant organizations like the Balochistan Liberation Front, the Balochistan Liberation Army, and the Baloch Republican Army are among those that have raised objections with regards to CPEC. There have been instances of attacking and killing Chinese nationals associated with CPEC. Many Baloch prefer autonomy and control over their own local resources for their development instead of foreign mega projects.

The Baluchistan province saw multiple attempted nationalist and separatist insurgencies before CPEC, but investments in Balochistan have led to a significant drop in separatist groups, and this effect has even seen the integration of the locals in Balochistan in the workforce at Gwadar. Despite this, Pakistan still alleges that India is supporting anti-CPEC agenda, and the Pakistani government often points to such evidence as the alleged Indian spy Kulbhushan Jadhav, who was caught in the Baluchistan province on 3 March 2016. Information regarding Jadhav was then presented to the United Nations. Exiled Baloch nationalist Hyrbyair Marri in 2016 warned the safety of Chinese nationals working on the project could not be guaranteed, though violence in the region peaked in 2013 before sharply declining.

The Pakistani government reported that over 800 Baloch militants surrendered to security forces in 2016 after the launch of a reconciliation programme, including over 200 at a single ceremony in November 2016. Balakh Sher Badini, a senior militant commander of the Balochistan Liberation Army, surrendered to Pakistani forces in January 2017. Another 21 militants from another militant group, the Balochistan Republican Army, surrendered shortly thereafter along with 3 militant commanders. A few days later, high-ranking militant commander Lal Din Bugti surrendered to Pakistani security forces, along with 6 other commanders. Separatist violence had decreased in the province so much by 2017, that such groups had become much less of a threat compared to Islamist militants.

Pakistan faced Taliban insurgent violence that largely began in 2008 during the rule of General Pervez Musharraf. China reportedly also expressed concern that militant groups in Xinjiang could collaborate with Tehrik-i-Taliban militants in Pakistan. In 2014, Pakistan launched Operation Zarb-e-Azb to eradicate Tehrik-i-Taliban militants from Pakistani territory, following an attack on Karachi's airport, and the 2014 Peshawar school massacre in which terrorists from Tehrik-i-Taliban killed 148 school children.

Following the launch of Operation Zarb-e-Azb, violence in Pakistan has drastically declined. 2016 saw the lowest number of deaths from acts of violence since the current wave of violence began in 2007, with total fatalities dropping nearly 66% compared to 2014. Acts of terrorist violence fell 75% between 2014 and 2016. According to the South Asia Terrorism Portal, civilian fatalities from terrorist attacks in 2013 stood at 3,001, while the number had declined to 612 by 2016 – the lowest number since 2005.

Alleged Indian subversion 
CPEC passes through the disputed region of Kashmir where Indian and Pakistani border guards have occasionally exchanged fire across the Line of Control, though no CPEC project is located near the line. Chinese intelligence agencies have also reportedly shared information with Pakistani authorities regarding alleged efforts by the India's Research and Analysis Wing to subvert CPEC. In March 2016, Pakistan reported that it had arrested Kulbhushan Yadav, whom Pakistan claims to be a spy from India's Research and Analysis Wing, and who entered Pakistan from Iran specifically to destabilize regions in Pakistan's Baluchistan province along with terrorist organization Tehrik-i-Taliban and Baloch liberation army (B.L.A) in order to hinder implementation of CPEC projects. India though has denied the claim saying that Yadav had been "kidnapped last year from Iran and his subsequent presence in Pakistan has never been explained credibly". Former Chief of Army Staff General Raheel Sharif in April 2016 accused India's Research and Analysis Wing of destabilizing Pakistan in an attempt to disrupt and stymie implementation of various CPEC projects. Pakistan's Secretary of Defense Lieutenant General Alam Khattak stated in April 2016 that the arrest of Kulbhushan Yadav indicated Indian interference in CPEC, and further alleged that India's Research and Analysis Wing, in collusion with Afghanistan's National Directorate of Security, had set up a dedicated espionage unit with express intent to sabotage CPEC. India moved to the International Court of Justice (ICJ), which after deliberation stayed execution of sentence passed by Pakistani military court, the ICJ also found violation of Vienna Convention on Diplomatic Relations by Pakistan and directed Pakistan to provide consular access to Kulbhushan Yadav in its July 2019 verdict.

Back in the 1980s, Uyghurs from China crossed into Pakistan to get enrolled in Madrassas and with the training and arms provided by Chinese government, they have fought the Soviets in Afghanistan. Upon returning back to China, many joined the violent Uyghur nationalist groups. Pakistani intelligence agencies had undertaken crackdown on Uyghurs militants of Islamic State returning from Syria and East Turkistan Islamic Movement (ETIM) along with Baloch rebel groups involved in targeting CPEC projects. They claim hostile Indian intelligence agencies are involved in training thousands of militants formerly belonging to Taliban factions. Nearly 30,000 Chinese workers are employed in about 280 Chinese funded projects where almost 35,000 security personnel have been deployed.

List of major projects

Cancelled projects

Challenges

Political, Legal and Social Risks
Political regimes in Pakistan are not stable and the civil government establishments have often seen military interference. Such scenarios result in frequent change in leadership thereby jeopardizing the agreements signed by previous leaders. This increases the uncertainty in the commercial environment, unreliable outcomes of investments and endangers the ease of doing business. This risk gets magnified when foreign investments and workers are involved. A flawed legal system in the country encourages sub-standard construction procedures, illegitimate bid activities, corrupt and unprofessional interference, breached contracts, unethical discrimination and irregularity in laws. Instances of crime, extortion, kidnapping, arms conflict, terrorist attacks, extremism & civil wars, nationwide strikes, protests, riots, and mass expropriations are hindrances to timely and successful completion of projects.

In 2021, local residents of Gwadar protested against the perceived threat to their livelihoods due to illegal fishing in local waters allegedly by Chinese trawlers. In 2023, the provincial government undertook a crackdown on the illegal trawlers after months of protests, resulting in reappearance of marine life.

Known for its dominance over civil institutions and democratic rule, China had sought to enlist Pakistan's military for the lead role as it guarantees the successful completion of projects at a time when the politicians were infighting for the ownership of the corridor projects. During the tenure of Nawaz Sharif, many projects were launched in Punjab Province which has a significant vote bank for the PML-N leader. Upon assuming power, Imran Khan pressurised the Chinese for development of Rashakai SEZ in Khyber Pakhtunkhwa Province which is stronghold for the PTI leader. 2017 official statistics shared with the parliament of Pakistan, showed out of 330 CPEC related projects in Pakistan, 176 are in Punjab province while Balochistan had an allocation of 8 CPEC projects. During 2018 national election campaign, Imran Khan rallied against the alleged corruption of previous government and highlighted unfair contracts in CPEC. Sceptics also question on the efficient usage of foreign money to develop the infrastructure given the level of corruption. China even temporarily halted the release of funds for 3 projects in 2017 due to reports of corruption.

In February 2023, the Gwadar Port was predicted to cost five times more which the officials blamed on the Gwadar Port Authority (GPA) and the Ministry of Maritime Affairs for having developed the dredging project in last year at Rs 1bn on guesstimates in emergency circumstances for the delivery and diverting of a couple 50,000DWT cargo ships due to navigational challenges. However, the costs were then increased based on a proper study conducted by Pakistan Navy followed by competitive bidding.

The delay of the maintenance dredging for a few years were already to possibly have serious repercussions in terms of penalties and damages that might have been imposed on GPA by the Concession Holder due to loss in business.

Criticism
Kaiser Bengali, a senior economist who was associated with Benazir Income Support Programme (BISP), Government of Pakistan and has headed research institutions including Social Policy and Development Centre (SPDC), Karachi, and Sustainable Development Policy Institute (SDPI), Islamabad, has highlighted that no feasibility study was conducted for the CPEC and the negative economic implications from the drawbacks of tax exemption given to Chinese products. Environmental Impact Assessment was also not done to offset the environmental cost of CPEC.

Chinese Intent
Although announced as developed for commercial purposes, chances of port infrastructure projects transforming into a well-equipped military naval base in the future cannot be ruled out. The earliest hints of military (PLA) involvement in this ambitious global project started appearing in 2015. In 2018, The New York Times speculated military interests of China in Pakistan "instead of an economic project with peaceful intent". Beijing-based military analysts and high ranking officials have highlighted geostrategic importance of Gwadar Port and indicated the need to develop a naval base in near vicinity similar to the one China built in Djibouti. However, when asked about Pakistan's offer to turn Gwadar into a PLA naval base, the spokeswoman for the Chinese Ministry of Foreign Affairs denied its existence, stating: “I have not heard of it. It’s my understanding that this issue was not touched upon.”

Observers have also pointed out that by involving nations in its megaprojects, China has silenced it's allies, including Pakistan, on the Uyghur situation. This is notable as all those who are vocal (like Imran Khan) on the religious aspects of conflicts in Palestine, Kashmir or that of Rohingya people does not highlight or raise the issue of human right violations against the Uyghurs. In 2022, many countries including Pakistan voted against and rejected another motion by Western countries seeking debate on China's treatment of Uyghur Muslims and Human Rights violations.

The fibreoptic project would aid in terrestrial distribution of broadcast Television in Pakistan which will cooperate with Chinese media in the “dissemination of Chinese culture”. The CPEC plan anticipates an intense and wide-ranging penetration in most sectors of Pakistan’s economy as well as its society by Chinese enterprises and culture. Access to the full supply chain of the agrarian economy is a top priority for the Chinese.

In 2022, Twitter suspended fake accounts being operated from Pakistan, identified in a report by the Indian non-profit organization Digital Forensics, Research and Analytics Centre (D-FRAC) that were involved in disinformation campaigns regarding CPEC. The report claimed they was spreading "false Chinese narratives regarding CPEC".

Debt Trap
CPEC is seen as the main plank of China's Belt and Road Initiative. Should the initial $46 billion worth of projects be implemented, the value of those projects would be roughly equivalent to all foreign direct investment in Pakistan since 1970, and would be equal to 17% of Pakistan's 2015 gross domestic product. The external debt of Pakistan has surged significantly after accepting this Chinese offer.

Chinese monetary offer for Pakistan under CPEC being a combination of Debt & Equity, it is evaluated that the Debt component will be serviced at 7%-8% interest per annum while Equity component is expected to deliver an estimated ROE of 17% per annum. The Pakistan government, however, claims that the Chinese loans will be repaid over a period of 20–25 years at rate of 2% interest. Christine Fair, a South Asia expert at Georgetown University has termed CPEC as "Colonizing Pakistan to Enrich China".

From early 1990s, IMF has provided more than a dozen bailouts on requests by Pakistan to save its dwindling economy, which has struggled 22 of the 30 years in meeting the austerity measures demanded by IMF. Nadeem-ul-Haque, a former IMF official and former deputy chairman of the Pakistani government’s Planning Commission wrote, "The pattern is always the same, with the Fund’s blessing, the government goes on a shopping spree, taking out costly loans for expensive projects, thus building up even more debt and adding new inefficiencies. After a few years, another crisis ensues, and it is met by another IMF program." The Pakistani establishment sees Chinese loans as an alternative to IMF loans.

Many of the nations with which China has partnered have a history of political instability, military intervention in governance, problems of law and order, rampant corruption, lack of transparency and no entrepreneurial culture. Hence the critics call these projects “a neo-colonial scheme” and “a debt trap” for many nations.

Parallels with Sri Lanka
Observers have drawn comparisons with 2022 economic turmoil of Sri Lanka as a consequence of inability to repay $6 billion in loans used to construct an expensive Chinese-led port and airport project in Hambantota. Sri Lankan authorities settled the debt by giving up control of the port and some 15,000 acres of land around it to China on a 99-year lease. Citing examples of several countries from Malaysia to Colombia involved in Belt and Road Initiative, the opacity involved in the Chinese ventures have evoked accusations that such projects lead to corruption and mismanagement that ultimately risk losing the natural resources and sovereignty of the participating nations. It is in resemblance with Gwadar Port given to Chinese control for a lease period of 40 years. Pakistan has already started negotiating the debt-relief from China owing to difficulties to repay the loan and is seeking ease in the payment obligations towards debt and its interest for the projects under CPEC. As of 2022, Pakistan owes China about $30 billion which accounts for nearly 30% of its foreign debt.

Financial Implications
According to official statistics, 20% of CPEC is debt-based finance, while 80% of CPEC are investments in Joint Ventures (JV) enterprise between Pakistan and China, with the initial estimate of project contributing to 40,000 jobs for local Pakistanis and 80,000 jobs for Chinese. However, at a later stage of project execution, it was reported that in some cases, China has apparently brought in its prisoners as workforce thereby depriving the opportunities for local Pakistani population. Official statistics suggested a return of US$6 billion to 8 billion from taxes per annum such as road and bridge tolls. The total CPEC loan is 6% of Pakistan's GDP, however many commentators and a few Governments claimed the project a debt-trap. Nevertheless, officials countered that 3.5% of Pakistani GDP per annum is lost due to poor transportation networks, which the CPEC investment aims to remedy leading to added benefits for any lag in Pakistan's growth statistic. Economic analysts have stated tangible benefits of this initiative including an end to the major energy shortages in Pakistan which had previously crippled economic growth. On 14 January 2020, Pakistan operationalized Gwadar Port for Afghan transit trade. On 31 May 2021, Gwadar Port become fully operational, along with the availability of online booking for the delivery of goods.

In addition to the aforementioned issues, some sources have suggested that the interest rate for CPEC related loans would be high, with India's Daily News and Analysis paper suggesting that Pakistan had unwittingly accepted loans that would "be offered at very high rates of interest", although the actual interest rates were negotiated prior to acceptance, and for most projects will be 1.6%; conversely previous Pakistani infrastructure projects financed by the World Bank carried an interest rate between 5% and 8.5% in comparison, and have strings attached.

Several articles in Pakistan have criticised the project's finances as being shrouded in mystery, while one article suggested that "there is far too much secrecy and far too little transparency". The Private Power and Infrastructure Board has also been accused of irregularities in the approval process for coal power plants and the tariffs at which Pakistan is contractually obliged to purchase electricity from those plants, with special concern regarding potential irregularities in the tariff approved for the 300 MW coal power plant to be built in Pind Dadan Khan by China Machinery Engineering Corporation.

In December 2017, it was reported that as per the Gwadar Port agreement, the Chinese companies would get 91 per cent but the Gwadar Port Authority would get only 9 per cent of revenue. In the same month a seven-member delegation of Senators visited China. On returning from China, all the Senators issued press statements and unequivocally claimed that Balochistan would not get anything from the CPEC. One of the senators, Senator Kabir Muhammad Shahi also claimed that while 60% of the funds are being used for power generation, other than 300 MW for Gwadar Port, not even 1 MW of that would be given to Balochistan.

Trade Imbalance
Local traders in Pakistan have expressed their reservations over CPEC. Chinese exports through the Karakoram Highway have entered the domestic Pakistani market, and are cheaper due to the relatively higher cost of production in Pakistan. It has also been speculated that the CPEC will replace Pakistani exports by Chinese ones in external markets. Increasing import of automobiles, weapons, home appliances and agricultural products from China to Pakistan is major concern for the disproportion trade deficit.

Baloch Nationalists
Resistance of impoverished locals in the Balochistan region's Gwadar is a major hurdle in this project. The region is a wealth of minerals but this does not reflect in the impoverished lives of residents who struggle for basic minimum necessities, such as clean drinking water, reliable power supply, education and health facilities. Government neglect on poverty and unemployment has given rise to religious extremism. Non-consultation before taking up the plan and the denial of employment to local population by bringing people from other provinces to work for the project has increased the hostility.

Some Baloch nationalists have opposed the large-scale development projects envisioned by CPEC, fearing that such developments in the province would eventually result in local residents "losing control" over natural resources. Others have alleged that CPEC is a "conspiracy" meant to stimulate the settlement of migrants from other regions of Pakistan in order to render ethnic Baloch a minority in the province.

In accordance to the Pakistani Government's announcement of its intent to issue resident cards to the city's inhabitants as a security measure to prevent the movement of firearms into the city, former Chief Minister of Balochistan province, Akhtar Mengal, suggested at a political rally in November 2015, that execution of CPEC projects and the resident card policy would eventually result in ethnic Baloch being denied entry into the city. The resident cards measure would require any non-resident visitor to the city to register at designated security checkpoints prior to entering the city by road, without any reference to ethnicity. The former Chief Minister did, however, clarify that he would not oppose development projects in the province that he believed would uplift the plight of local residents. Shortly thereafter, the Pakistani government announced its intention to establish a training institute named Pak-China Technical and Vocational Institute at Gwadar which is to be completed at the cost of 943 million rupees to impart skills to local residents to train them to operate machinery at the port.

Indian analyst Athar Hussain, the director of the Asia Research Centre at London School of Economics, has expressed concerns that the CPEC is "likely to bring more development to regions that are already developed, instead of poor areas such as Balochistan." Burzine Waghmar, a member of the Centre for the Study of Pakistan, SOAS, University of London, suggested that CPEC projects are not targeted towards benefiting the indigenous Baloch population, and will accelerate human rights violations in the province.

In December 2016, the Federation of Pakistan Chambers of Commerce and Industry (FPCCI) released a report that given the rate at which Chinese nationals were migrating to Balochistan for the CPEC project, the Chinese would outnumber the Baloch people by 2048, raising concerns of marginalisation of the Baloch citizens.

Gwadar residents' concerns
Access to traditional fishing zones and subsistence fishing practices, involvement and hiring of local people in the developmental projects, curbing interference of security forces in daily city affairs and easing the navigation from checkpoints and surveillance installations, right healthcare and quality education are among the demands of Gwadar residents.

While nationalists openly oppose CPEC, some local leaders and residents of Gwadar city have also expressed concern in regards to the project – the head of Gwadar's local fisherman association stated in an interview with NBC News that "Development is good, China is our great friend, this CPEC thing sounds amazing, but don't forget that this is our land, first." Other residents doubt they will see any of the benefits promised by CPEC, while others fear they will be evicted from their homes in order to make way for infrastructure works.

In response to concerns of local residents, Lt. General Amer Riaz who currently 
heads security operations in the province, stated that locals would not be deprived of benefits, and that local Gwadar residents would have "the first right to everything." Pakistan's Minister of Planning, National Reforms, and Development, Ahsan Iqbal, further stated in May 2016 that Gwadar residents would be regarded as "main stakeholders" in the city's master plan, and that fishermen specifically would also be accommodated by the plan. The developer of Gwadar Port, COPHC, has also announced that it will assist Gwadar's fishermen to help boost the region's seafood industry by developing programmes to improve the quality of local seafoods.

KP Provincial Assembly

Some planning aspects and technicalities associated with the route have been criticised in political forums and by the media. The Provincial Assembly of Khyber Pakhtunkhwa province adopted a resolution against the alleged decision of the central government to change the multibillion route of the proposed project by diverting it away from Khyber Pakhtunkhwa province.

The federal Minister of Planning Development and Reform Ahsan Iqbal formally denied any change in the alignment. According to Dr Ahmad Rashid Malik, senior research fellow at the Institute of Strategic Studies Islamabad (ISSI), the route controversy is "baseless and an unfounded reality...". As a result of objections to CPEC, the Chinese government in 2015 issued a statement urging Pakistani political parties to resolve their differences over the project.

Indian objections 
India's objections to Chinese activity in Pakistan-administred Kashmir dates back to the 1970s, when the People's Liberation Army built the Karakoram Highway that linked China's far-western province of Xinjiang with northern Pakistan.

The Government of India, which shares tense relations with Pakistan, objects to the CPEC project as upgrade works to the Karakoram Highway are taking place in Gilgit-Baltistan; territory that India claims as its own. During the visit of Indian Prime Minister Narendra Modi to China in 2015, the Indian Foreign Minister, Sushma Swaraj reportedly told Chinese Communist Party general secretary Xi Jinping that projects passing through Gilgit-Baltistan are "unacceptable" as they require construction in the claimed territory. India's Foreign Secretary Subrahmanyam Jaishankar also confirmed that the issue had been raised with the Chinese government on the trip. Swaraj reiterated this stance during a meeting in August 2016 with Chinese foreign minister Wang Yi, stating India would "resolutely oppose" the corridor in Kashmir.

India further did not initially object to major Chinese-sponsored upgrade works to the Karakoram Highway after a 2010 earthquake, though it did object the presence of Chinese troops in the region that were sent to guard Chinese workers.

India further did not object to construction of the Mangla Dam, undertaken with World Bank funding and British technical assistance in southern Kashmir − a region which India claims as its own territory. India even maintained that the Wullar Barrage project in Indian-administered Kashmir, which Pakistan regards as a violation of the Indus Water Treaty, would ultimately be beneficial for the Mangla Dam. India further did not object to construction works at the Kashmir's Neelum–Jhelum Hydropower Plant, under construction with Chinese assistance since 2008. India in 1991 did not raise objections to its construction.

Following the 2005 Kashmir earthquake, large-scale reconstruction work of infrastructure took place across northern Kashmir with the assistance of South Korean, Turkish, and Saudi firms. Chinese companies took part in 14 post-earthquake reconstruction projects in the disputed region, worth $6 billion. India did not object to these works, despite the fact that infrastructure near the militarily sensitive Line of Control were upgraded.

Indian objection to Chinese construction works in the Gilgit-Baltistan arose in 2011 in response to a Chinese complaint regarding a joint Indian-Vietnamese oil exploration project in the disputed South China Sea. The influential Institute for Defence Studies and Analyses, a think tank funded by the Indian Ministry of Defence, in 2011 called for India to begin raising objection to Chinese projects in the region at the "international level."

See also 

 Bangladesh-China-India-Myanmar Economic Corridor
 Central Asia Regional Economic Cooperation Program
 China–Pakistan relations
 Khyber Pass Economic Corridor
 Maritime Silk Road
 One Belt, One Road initiative
 Quadrilateral Traffic in Transit Agreement
 String of Pearls (Indian Ocean)
 The China-Pakistan Economic Corridor of the Belt and Road Initiative (book)

Notes

References

External links 
 Official CPEC website (Government of Pakistan)
 
 
 Rafiq, Arif, "The China-Pakistan Economic Corridor: Barriers and Impact," United States Institute of Peace, October 2017.
 "China-Pakistan Economic Corridor: Opportunities and Risks", International Crisis Group, 29 June 2018.

Belt and Road Initiative
China-Pakistan Economic Corridor
China–Pakistan relations
Economic development programs
Investment in Pakistan
Proposed transport infrastructure in Pakistan
Proposed transport infrastructure in China
Trade routes